Bob Sreenan (born 7 May 1934) is a British former swimmer. Sreenan competed at the 1952 Summer Olympics and the 1960 Summer Olympics. He won the 1957 ASA National Championship 440 yards freestyle title.

References

1934 births
Living people
British male freestyle swimmers
Olympic swimmers of Great Britain
Swimmers at the 1952 Summer Olympics
Swimmers at the 1960 Summer Olympics
Sportspeople from Manchester
Commonwealth Games medallists in swimming
Commonwealth Games silver medallists for Scotland
Swimmers at the 1958 British Empire and Commonwealth Games
Medallists at the 1958 British Empire and Commonwealth Games
Scottish male freestyle swimmers